Guitar Slinger may refer to:

Guitar Slinger (Johnny Winter album), 1984
Guitar Slinger (The Brian Setzer Orchestra album), 1996
Guitar Slinger (Vince Gill album), 2011